Punta Banda is a prominent cape located southwest of the city of Ensenada in Ensenada Municipality, Baja California, Mexico.

Geography
Punta Banda forms the southern boundary of the Bahía de Todos Santos, sheltering the Port of Ensenada from the Southern California Countercurrent.

Ecology
The peninsula lies on the boundary between the California coastal sage and chaparral ecoregion to the northeast, and the Baja California Desert to the southwest.

Tourism
The peninsula is a popular tourist destination for those visiting La Bufadora, the second largest blowhole in the world and the only one in the American continent.

See also
Punta Colonet, Baja California

References

Geography of Baja California
Ensenada Municipality